Skank may refer to:

Music
 Skank (band), a Brazilian rock/pop/reggae/ska band
 Skank (album), the band's self-titled debut album
 Skank (guitar), a guitar technique used in reggae, ska, and rocksteady
 Skank beat, a drum beat common in punk and heavy metal music

Other art, entertainment, and media
 Skank (dance), a form of dance related to ska, grime and hardcore punk
 Skank (magazine), a British satirical magazine published 1994-97

See also
 
 "The Rockafeller Skank", a song by Fatboy Slim
 Ska, a music genre that originated in Jamaica
 Slut (disambiguation)